Abd ar-Rahman, Abdurrahman or Darman was Shehu of Borno from 1853 to 1854.

Reign of 'Abd ar-Rahman
With the help of some courtiers of Kukawa, 'Abd ar-Rahman deposed his brother Umar in November 1853 and became Shehu of Borno. He was considered too violent and tyrannical by his followers which explains why he only reigned for ten months before his brother reconquered his throne in September 1854. He was then executed, most probably in December 1854.

'Abd ar-Rahman as seen by Heinrich Barth
In 1851, a British expedition led by Heinrich Barth arrived in Borno. For Barth, 'Abd ar-Rahman was a:

Dynasty

Footnotes

Bibliography
 Barth, Heinrich, Travels and Discoveries in North and Central Africa (London: Longman, 1857).
 Brenner, Louis, The Shehus of Kukawa: A History of the Al-Kanemi Dynasty of Bornu, Oxford Studies in African Affairs (Oxford, Clarendon Press, 1973).
 Cohen, Ronald, The Kanuri of Bornu, Case Studies in Cultural Anthropology (New York: Holt, 1967).
 Denham, Dixon  and Captain Clapperton and the Late Doctor Oudney, Narrative of Travels and Discoveries in Northern and Central Africa, (Boston: Cummings, Hilliards and Co., 1826).
 Isichei, Elizabeth, A History of African Societies to 1870 (Cambridge: Cambridge University Press, 1997), pp. 318–320, .
 Lange, Dierk, 'The kingdoms and peoples of Chad', in General history of Africa, ed. by Djibril Tamsir Niane, IV (London: Unesco, Heinemann, 1984), pp. 238–265.
 Last, Murray, ‘Le Califat De Sokoto Et Borno’, in Histoire Generale De l'Afrique, Rev. ed. (Paris: Presence Africaine, 1986), pp. 599–646.
 Lavers, John, "The Al- Kanimiyyin Shehus: a Working Chronology" in Berichte des Sonderforschungsbereichs, 268, Bd. 2, Frankfurt a. M. 1993: 179-186.

 Palmer, Herbert Richmond, The Bornu Sahara and Sudan (London: John Murray, 1936).

External links
Kanuri Studies Association

Royalty of Borno
19th-century rulers in Africa
19th-century Nigerian people
1854 deaths
Year of birth unknown